The J.P. Schneider Store is a historic commerce building in downtown Austin, Texas built in 1873. Built along Second Street, the structure is the only remaining historic building in the immediate vicinity and is today surrounded by Austin City Hall and the headquarters of Silicon Labs.

The building was added to the National Register of Historic Places in 1979. , Lamberts Downtown Barbeque is housed in the space.

References

External links

Buildings and structures in Austin, Texas
National Register of Historic Places in Austin, Texas
Commercial buildings on the National Register of Historic Places in Texas
City of Austin Historic Landmarks